The Noon mark is a type of sundial that at its simplest is a vertical line on a  south facing wall or a north-south line on a horizontal pavement. When the shadow of a point (or a projected image of the Sun) crosses the line it will be midday. Noon in local standard time is defined as when the sun is overhead, however clocks and watches use mean time which varies from standard time by a few minutes each day. The difference is calculated using the equation of time and this can be shown on the noon mark by drawing an analemma, or using a correction table.

References

Notes

Bibliography
 
 
  Slightly amended reprint of the 1970 translation published by University of Toronto Press (Toronto). The original was published in 1965 under the title Les Cadrans solaires by Gauthier-Villars (Montrouge, France).
 

Sundials